Hugh Barre was the fifth recorded Archdeacon of Leicester: he served from 1148 until his resignation in 1157.

Notes

See also
 Diocese of Lincoln
 Diocese of Peterborough
 Diocese of Leicester
 Archdeacon of Leicester

Archdeacons of Leicester
12th-century English people